Peiffer is a surname. Notable people with the surname include:

Arnd Peiffer (born 1987), German biathlete
Bernard Peiffer (1922–1976), French jazz pianist, composer, and teacher
Dan Peiffer (born 1951), American football player

See also
Peifer
Pfeiffer (surname)